Yelverton Lodge is an 18th-century hunting lodge on Richmond Road, Twickenham in the London Borough of Richmond upon Thames. Situated opposite  Marble Hill Park and Marble Hill House, it was acquired for Henrietta Howard, Countess of Suffolk, who was a mistress of King George II.

Other owners
1793 James Haverfield 
1794 J J Valloton
1805 The Hon Henry Yelverton (d.1805). Property sub-let to: 
Henry Cotterell
1806 House rebuilt
1808 William Richards. Property sub-let to: 
Joseph Thackeray 
Dr Anderson 
William Richards Butler 
Richard J T Hatton (brother of John Liptrot Hatton)
1851 Emma Ryde and others 
1853 Turner Esq MD 
1872 Richard Hatton 
1879 Vincent Griffiths (1831–1917), who previousy lived at Chapel House, Montpelier Row in Twickenham

References

18th-century establishments in England
History of the London Borough of Richmond upon Thames
Houses in the London Borough of Richmond upon Thames
Hunting lodges in England
Twickenham